Yania Ferrales Monteagudo (born 28 July 1977) is a Cuban discus thrower.

Her personal best throw is 66.00 metres, achieved in February 2006 in Havana.

Personal bests
Discus throw: 66.00 –  La Habana, 10 February 2006

Achievements

External links

Sports reference biography
Tilastopaja biography
Picture of Yania Ferrales

References

1977 births
Living people
People from Morón, Cuba
Cuban female discus throwers
Athletes (track and field) at the 2004 Summer Olympics
Athletes (track and field) at the 2008 Summer Olympics
Athletes (track and field) at the 2003 Pan American Games
Athletes (track and field) at the 2007 Pan American Games
Olympic athletes of Cuba
Pan American Games medalists in athletics (track and field)
Pan American Games silver medalists for Cuba
Pan American Games bronze medalists for Cuba
Central American and Caribbean Games gold medalists for Cuba
Competitors at the 2006 Central American and Caribbean Games
Central American and Caribbean Games medalists in athletics
Medalists at the 2003 Pan American Games
Medalists at the 2007 Pan American Games
21st-century Cuban women